Janice N. Harrington is an American storyteller, poet, and children's writer.

Life
She grew up in Vernon, Alabama. Her family moved to Lincoln, Nebraska to escape racial segregation when she was eight.

She worked as a public librarian in Champaign, Illinois, and as a professional storyteller, appearing at the National Storytelling Festival.
She now teaches in the Creative Writing Program at the University of Illinois at Urbana-Champaign.

Her work appears in African American Review, Alaska Quarterly Review, Beloit Poetry Journal, Harvard Review, Indiana Review, Field, Prairie Schooner, Southern Review, and other journals.

Selected awards
 2009 Rona Jaffe Foundation Writers' Award
 2008 Kate Tufts Discovery Award, for Even the Hollow My Body Made Is Gone
 2008 A. Poulin, Jr. Poetry Prize 
 2007 National Endowment for the Arts Literature Fellowship for Poetry
 2007 TIME Magazine's top 10 children's books
 2007 Cybils Award for the year's best fiction picture book: "the children’s and YA bloggers’ literary awards"
 2005 Ezra Jack Keats New Writer Award, for Going North
 Illinois Arts Council Literary Award

Works

Poetry
 
 
 
 "Shaking the Grass", Verse Daily

Children's

References

External links

 
 "Featured Illinois Poet", selected by the Illinois Poet Laureate
 

American children's writers
University of Illinois Urbana-Champaign faculty
Poets from Alabama
American women poets
American women children's writers
Living people
Place of birth missing (living people)
Rona Jaffe Foundation Writers' Award winners
21st-century American women
1956 births